The 1996 Sonoma State Cossacks football team represented Sonoma State University as a member of the Northern California Athletic Conference (NCAC) during the 1996 NCAA Division II football season. Led by fourth-year head coach Frank Scalercio, Sonoma State compiled an overall record of 2–8 with a mark of 2–2 in conference play, placing second in the NCAC. The team was outscored by its opponents 280  to 134 for the season. The average score in the eight losses was 44–7. The Cossacks played home games at Cossacks Stadium in Rohnert Park, California.

1996 was the last year Sonoma State played intercollegiate football. On December 9, the school announced it was dropping the football program citing budget constraints. Scalercio finished his tenure at Sonoma State with an overall record of 7–30–1, for a winning percentage of .197.

Schedule

Notes

References

Sonoma State
Sonoma State Cossacks football seasons
Sonoma State Cossacks football